The Catholic Church in French Guiana is part of the worldwide Catholic Church, under the spiritual leadership of the Pope in Rome.

Around 75% of the population is Catholic and the dependency forms a single diocese - the Diocese of Cayenne.

Erected as the apostolic prefecture of French Guiana-Cayenne in 1651, it remained a prefecture until elevated to a Vicariate in January 1933, and finally to the Diocese of Cayenne in February 1956. The Diocese is currently a suffragan of the Archdiocese of Fort-de-France et Saint-Pierre on the island of Martinique. The current bishop is Emmanuel Marie Philippe Louis Lafont, appointed in June 2004. That was actually the former bishop but the Wikipedia editors have not updated it. The new bishop is Louis Sankalé.

See also
Pan-Amazonian Ecclesial Network (REPAM)

References

External links
 catholic-hierarchy.org

 
Religion in French Guiana
French Guiana
French Guiana
1651 establishments in the French colonial empire